The Urueña River (Spanish, Río Río Urueña) is a river of Argentina. It is a tributary of the Horcones River.

See also
List of rivers of Argentina

References

 Rand McNally, The New International Atlas, 1993.

Rivers of Argentina
Rivers of Salta Province
Rivers of Santiago del Estero Province
Rivers of Tucumán Province